Lunch atop a Skyscraper is a black-and-white photograph taken on September 20, 1932, of eleven ironworkers sitting on a steel beam  above the ground on the sixty-ninth floor of the RCA Building in Manhattan, New York City. It was arranged as a publicity stunt, part of a campaign promoting the skyscraper. The photograph was first published in October 1932 during the construction of Rockefeller Center. In 2016 it was acquired by the Visual China Group.

The image is often misattributed to Lewis Hine; the identity of the photographer remains unknown. Evidence emerged indicating it may have been taken by Charles C. Ebbets, but it was later found that other photographers had been present at the shoot as well. Many claims have been made regarding the identities of the men in the image, though only a few have been definitively identified. Ken Johnston, manager of the historic collections of Corbis, called the image as "a piece of American history".

Overview 

These men were immigrant ironworkers employed at the RCA Building during the construction of Rockefeller Center. They were accustomed to walking along the girders. The photograph was taken as part of a campaign promoting the skyscraper. Other photographs taken depict the workers throwing a football and pretending to sleep on the girder. Central Park is visible in the background.

History 
The photograph was first published in the Sunday supplement of the New York Herald Tribune on October 2, 1932, with the caption: "Lunch Atop a Skyscraper".

In 1995, Corbis Images, a company that provides archived images to professional photographers, bought a collection of over eleven million images called the Bettmann Archive. The Lunch atop a Skyscraper photograph was in the Acme Newspictures archive, a part of the Bettmann Archive collection, although it was uncredited. According to Ken Johnston, manager of the historic collections of Corbis, the image was initially received in a Manila paper envelope. The original negative of the photograph was made of glass, which had broken into five pieces. It is stored in a humidity and temperature-controlled preservation facility at the Iron Mountain storage facility in Pennsylvania.

In 2016, Visual China Group purchased Corbis's image division and content licensing unit, including the Bettman Archive and Lunch atop a Skyscraper. Visual China Group licenses the photograph internationally through an agreement with Getty Images.

Identification

Photographer 
The identity of the photographer is unknown. It was often misattributed to Lewis Hine, a Works Progress Administration photographer, from the mistaken assumption that the structure is the Empire State Building. In 1998, Tami Ebbets Hahn, a resident of Wilmington, North Carolina, noticed a poster of the image and speculated that it was one of her father's (Charles C. Ebbets; 1905–1978) photographs. In 2003, she contacted Johnston. Corbis hired Marksmen Inc., a private investigation firm, to find the photographer. An investigator discovered an article from The Washington Post, which credited the image to Hamilton Wright. The Wright family, however, was not familiar with the photograph. It was common for Wright to receive credit for photographs taken by those working for him; Hahn's father had worked for the Hamilton Wright Features syndicate.

In 1932, Ebbets had been appointed the photographic director of Rockefeller Center, responsible for publicizing the new skyscraper. Hahn found her father's paycheck of $1.50 per hour (equivalent to $ per hour in ), the ironworkers photograph, and an image of her father with a camera, which appeared to be of the same place and time. Analyzing the evidence, Johnston said: "As far as I'm concerned, he's the photographer." Corbis later acknowledged Ebbets's authorship. It was later discovered that photographers Thomas Kelley, William Leftwich, and Ebbets were present there on that day. Due to the uncertain identity of the photographer, the image is again without credit.

Ironworkers 
According to a New York Post survey, numerous claims have been made regarding the identities of the men in the image. The 2012 documentary Men at Lunch investigated claims that two of the men were Irish immigrants, and the director reported in 2013 that he planned to follow up on other claims from Swedish relatives. The film confirms the identities of two men: Joseph Eckner, third from the left, and Joe Curtis, third from the right, by cross-referencing with other pictures taken the same day, in which they were named at the time. The first man from the right, holding a bottle, has been identified as Slovak worker Gustáv (Gusti) Popovič. The photograph was found in his estate, with the note "Don't you worry, my dear Mariška, as you can see I'm still with bottle" written on the back.

Legacy 
The photograph has been referred to as the "most famous picture of a lunch break in New York history" by Ashley Cross, a correspondent of the New York Post. It has been used and imitated in many artworks. It has been colorized. Sculptor Sergio Furnari modeled from it a  statue, which was displayed near the World Trade Center site after the September 11 attacks. The image has been a best seller for its licensors. Although critics have dismissed the photograph as a publicity stunt, Johnston called it "a piece of American history". Taken during the Great Depression, the photograph became an icon of New York City and has often been re-created by construction workers. Time included the image in its 2016 list of the 100 most influential images. Discussing the significance of the image in 2012, Johnston said:
There's the incongruity between the action – lunch – and the place – 800 feet in the air – and that these guys are so casual about it. It's visceral: I've had people tell me they have trouble looking at it out of fear of heights. And these men – you feel you get a very strong sense of their characters through their expressions, clothes and poses.

See also 
 List of photographs considered the most important

Citations

Works cited 

English sources

 
 
 
 
 
 
 
 
 
 
 
 
 

Non-English sources

 
 
 
 

1932 works
1932 in art
1932 in New York City
1930s photographs
1930s in Manhattan
Black-and-white photographs
Lunch
Photographs of the United States
Publicity stunts
Rockefeller Center
September 1932 events
Works of unknown authorship
Works originally published in the New York Herald Tribune